The Latin Grammy Award for Best Arrangement is an award presented at the Latin Grammy Awards beginning in 2018, a ceremony that recognizes excellence and creates a wider awareness of cultural diversity and contributions of Latin recording artists in the United States and internationally. The award goes to the arranger(s). An arranger should not be entered more than twice in the Best Arrangement category, whether for instrumental or vocal arrangement (a Capella) included, if the artist is the same.

Winners and nominees

2010s

2020s

See also 
Grammy Award for Best Arrangement, Instrumental and Vocals
Grammy Award for Best Arrangement, Instrumental or A Cappella

References

External links
Official site of the Latin Grammy Awards

Awards established in 2018
Latin Grammy Award categories